Fukuia integra, also known as Blanfordia integra, is a species of land snail which has an operculum, a terrestrial gastropod mollusk in the family Pomatiopsidae.

Taxonomy 
Henry Augustus Pilsbry described this species under name Blanfordia integra in 1924.

Davis (1979) noted that genital structures of Blanfordia integra are similar to those of Fukuia. Although he doubted if Fukuia and Blanfordia are morphologically distinct based on such evidence, it is an apparent confusion resulting from the inadequate generic assignment of Blanfordia integra.

According to the molecular analyses of 18S ribosomal RNA, 28S ribosomal RNA, 16S ribosomal RNA, and cytochrome-c oxidase I (COI) genes by Kameda & Kato (2011) noted that Blanfordia integra is undoubtedly a member of the genus Fukuia.

Distribution 
This species is endemic to Japan. It is a Vulnerable species.

The type locality is Makuragisan, Izumo, Honshu.

Description 
The shape of the shell is broadly ovate. The shell has 4.5-5.3 whorls. There is a strong axial sculpture on the shell.

The width of the shell is 2.4-3.2 mm. The height of the shell is 3.6-5.2 mm.

Ecology 
This species lives as a terrestrial snail in inland forests. It is often arboreal.

References 
This article incorporates CC-BY-2.0 text from the reference

Further reading 
 Minato H. (1980). "Blanfordia integra Pilsbry, 1924 (Pomatiopsidae); its morphology, ecology, and distribution". Nanki Seibutu 22: 77-79.
 Minato H. (2005). "Blanfordia integra". In Threatened Wildlife of Japan: Red Data Book 2nd ed., Land and Freshwater Mollusks. Volume 6. Edited by Ministry of the Environment. Tokyo, Ministry of the Environment. 172.

External links 

Pomatiopsidae
Gastropods described in 1924